L'abitudine di tornare ("The habit of returning") is the eighth studio album by Italian singer-songwriter Carmen Consoli. It was issued in 2015, five years after the greatest hits Per niente stanca and  six years after her last studio album Elettra. The album is named after the single "L'abitudine di tornare", released in November 2014. The album peaked at third place on the Italian hit parade.

Track listing

Charts

Certifications

References

2015 albums